Prince Paul may refer to:
Prince Paul of Romania
Prince Paul of Thurn and Taxis
Prince Paul of Württemberg
Prince Paul of Yugoslavia
Prince Paul (producer)